Tomas Luiz da Conceição, O.A.D. (1703–1744) was a Roman Catholic prelate who served as Bishop of São Tomé e Príncipe (1742–1744).

Biography
Tomas Luiz da Conceição was born in Lisbon, Portugal on 25 Aug 1703 and ordained a priest in the Order of Discalced Augustinians on 4 Aug 1726.
On 3 Jul 1742, he was selected as Bishop of São Tomé e Príncipe and confirmed by Pope Benedict XIV on 26 Nov 1742.
In 1743, he was consecrated bishop. 
He served as Bishop of São Tomé e Príncipe until his death in 1744.

References 

18th-century Roman Catholic bishops in São Tomé and Príncipe
Bishops appointed by Pope Benedict XIV
1703 births
1744 deaths
People from Lisbon
Discalced Augustinian bishops
Portuguese Roman Catholic bishops in Africa
Roman Catholic bishops of São Tomé and Príncipe